Yuliya Aleksandrovna Saltsevich (born May 12, 1967 in Riga, Latvian SSR) is a retired Russian female volleyball player who was a member of the USSR women's volleyball team from 1985 to 1986. She was a member of the Soviet squad that won the gold medal at the 1985 European Championship in Netherlands and the gold medal at the 1986 Goodwill Games in Moscow. She was also part of the Soviet team that took the 6th place in the 1986 World Championship in Prague.

On club level, Saltsevich played for CSKA Moscow from 1983 to 1988, winning 1 CEV Champions Cup (1985–86), 1 CEV Cup Winners' Cup (1987–88), 1 USSR Championship (1984–85) and 1 USSR Cup (1984). She was also part of the Moscow team that won the gold medal at the 1986 Spartakiad of Peoples of the USSR. In 1988, Saltsevich suffered a very serious spinal injury that kept her out of action for four years. Nevertheless, she fully recovered and enjoyed a successful career in Greece where she played for Panathinaikos (1992–1993, 1995–1996), Olympiacos (1993–1995) and Filathlitikos (1999–2005), winning 2 Greek Championships.

After her retirement in 2005, she became a volleyball coach. She coached Filathlitikos (2005–2006) and SDUSHOR-65 Nika (2007–2009) and in 2009 she became head coach of 
Anorthosis Famagusta. Under her guidance, Anorthosis won the Cypriot Championship and the Cypriot Cup in 2009–10 season.

Sporting achievements

Player

Clubs
 CEV Champions Cup
  1985/1986 with CSKA Moscow

 CEV Cup Winners' Cup
  1987/1988 with CSKA Moscow

 USSR Championship
  1984–85 with CSKA Moscow
 USSR Cup
  1984 with CSKA Moscow
 Greek Championship
  1992–93 with Panathinaikos
  2002–03

National Team
 European Championship
  1985
 Goodwill Games
  1986

Coach
 Cyprus Championship
  2009–10 with Anorthosis Famagusta
 Cyprus Cup
  2009–10 with Anorthosis Famagusta

References

External links
 interview at sentragoal.gr 
 Волейбол: Энциклопедия / Сост. В. Л. Свиридов, О. С. Чехов. — Томск: Компания «Янсон», 2001. 

1967 births
Living people
Sportspeople from Riga
Panathinaikos Women's Volleyball players
Olympiacos Women's Volleyball players
Soviet women's volleyball players
Russian women's volleyball players
Goodwill Games medalists in volleyball
Competitors at the 1986 Goodwill Games